G Force is the second studio album by American saxophonist Kenny G. It was released by Arista Records in 1983, and peaked at number 6 on the Billboard Jazz Albums chart, number 17 on the R&B/Hip-Hop Albums, and number 62 on the Billboard 200 chart.

Track listing

Track information adapted from Discogs and then verified from the LP label.

Personnel 
 Kenny G – saxophones, flute, synthesizer programming, arrangements (1-6), synthesizers (1, 2, 3, 5), Lyricon solo (5), percussion (6)
 Barry J. Eastman – keyboards (1, 3, 5, 6)
 Jeff Lorber – keyboards (1, 2, 4)
 Peter Scherer –  Synclavier (1-6, 8)
 Kashif – arrangements (1, 2, 3, 5, 7, 8), keyboards (7, 8), synthesizers (7, 8), Synclavier (7), drums (7, 8), percussion (7, 8), bass (8)
 Paul Lawrence Jones III – keyboards (8)
 Ira Siegel – guitars (1, 3, 6, 8)
 Marlon McClain – guitars (2, 4, 6)
 Wayne Brathwaite – bass (1-7), arrangements (1, 3, 5, 6), synthesizers (3, 5, 6), percussion (6)
 Omar Hakim – drums (1, 2, 4, 6)
 Yogi Horton – drums (3)
 Leslie Ming – drums (3, 5)
 Bashiri Johnson – percussion (1, 3, 4, 5)
 Steve Kroon – percussion (2)
 Steve Horton – arrangements (1, 5)
 Barry "Sunjohn" Johnson – lead vocals (1, 5)
 Steve Horton – backing vocals 
 Freddie Jackson – backing vocals 
 La Forrest 'La La' Cope – backing vocals
 Yolanda Lee – backing vocals
 B. J. Nelson – backing vocals
 Lillo Thomas – backing vocals

Production 
 Producer – Wayne Brathwaite
 Co-Producer on Track 2 – Kenny G
 Executive Producer on Track 2 – Kashif
 Engineer – Darrell Gustamachio
 Additional Engineers – Carl Beatty, Bill Dooley, Brian McGee and Jon Smith.
 Additional drum engineering on Track 3 – Michael Brauer
 Assistant Engineers – Ron Banks, Larry DeCarmine, John Davenport and Tom Gartland.
 Mixed by Steve Goldman
 Art Direction – Donn Davenport and Howard Fritzson
 Logo Design – Tony Gable
 Photography – Pierre Chanteau
 Management – Jeffrey Ross Music

Charts

Album

Singles

References 

1983 albums
Arista Records albums
Kenny G albums